Karji is a small village in the Ratnagiri district of the State of Maharashtra, India. The village's code is 03988500, and its PIN code is 415727.

Geography
The village is surrounded by two rivers, one of which is the Jagbudi.

Demographics
Karji consists of four sub-villages (Tambe Mohallah, Chougle Mohallah, Rehmat Mohallah, Amshet and Karji Gavalwadi), with over 600 homes and a total population approaching 3000. Community surnames include Jadhav, Tambe, Parkar, Chougle, Yedre, Burte, Dhanavade, Devrukhkar, Nadkar, Jagde and Gawade. The main religions are Hinduism, Buddhism and Islam (Hindu kunbi samaj). The main source of income is rice-farming, and most of the village's youth work in the Middle Eastern countries of Oman, Saudi Arabia, Kuwait, United Arab Emirates, Bahrain and Qatar. Some of them are settled in the United Kingdom, United States of America, South Africa and other countries.

Amenities
Education is available in Urdu and Marathi. Adarsha High School and Junior College in Karji was one of the first schools at this level in the area.

The village has a water scheme, a telephone exchange, Internet services (dial-up connection Sancharnet as Prepaid, NetOne as Postpaid and ADSL broadband) from BSNL, Cell phone (Mobile) services of Vodafone Essar, Bharti Airtel, Idea Cellular, Tata Teleservices, BSNL and Reliance Communications, a government hospital and a postal service. The village has a branch of the State Bank of India, and a bridge over a creek that is connected to the Jagbudi. Bus services are run by the Maharashtra State Road Transport Corporation (MSRTC).

See also
 Ashti, Ratnagiri
 Bahirwali
 Kondivali
 Savnas
 Shirshi

References

Villages in Ratnagiri district